is a Japanese journalist, television interviewer, and author with a background in international politics.

Career
Born in Yamanashi Prefecture, Nakamaru studied abroad at Columbia University. While beginning to write articles and books on international relations, she hosted a number of nationally broadcast television interview series, including  in 1972. The magazine Newsweek nicknamed her "the Edward R. Murrow of Japan" in a 1974 profile that introduced her alongside Makiko Tanaka as one of a "handful of Japanese women who have bucked their country's patriarchal system". The profile itself was news in Japan. During her career, she has interviewed such world figures as Saddam Hussein, Edward M. Kennedy, the Shah of Iran Mohammad Reza Pahlavi, and Idi Amin.

Family
Nakamaru asserts that she is the granddaughter of the Emperor Meiji. These claims have been disputed in a Korean newspaper article.

Nakamaru was married to the film and television actor Tadao Nakamaru, who died on 23 April 2009.

References

External links
 

Living people
Japanese writers
1937 births
Japanese television personalities
Japanese television journalists